Samuel J. Reader (1836–1914) was an American diarist and artist who wrote about his experiences living in Bleeding Kansas and the American Civil War.

Biography

Samuel James Reader was born on January 25, 1836, in Greenfield (present-day Coal Center), Pennsylvania, where his father settled in 1847 upon his second marriage, the son of carpenter and millwright Francis Reader and Catherine (née James) Reader. His mother died May 19, 1836, and he was raised by his maternal grandparents and an aunt, Eliza James. He lived in La Harpe, Illinois, from the age of five to 18. He had a sister, Eliza Matilda, who later became the wife of Dr. M. A. Campdoras.

He began recording events of his life in journals in 1847 after being inspired by the documentation of the Lewis and Clark Expedition. In 1855, he traveled in a wagon from Illinois and settled on a farm near Indianola, Shawnee County, Kansas, with his sister and his aunt. An early settler of Shawnee County who remained a resident of the state until his death, his continuing journals captured the history of the territory and early years of the state. He illustrated his writings with primitive watercolor and oil paintings and pen and ink illustrations. They were written in English and French.

He served as a sergeant of the Indianola Guards, a local militia group, and was a member of John Brown's forces, opposing slavery and supporting Kansas as a free state prior to the Civil War. In 1856, he participated in the conflict against the Border Ruffians and fought in the Battle of Hickory Point, coming "under fire" for the first time.

He was a second lieutenant and later paymaster of Company D of the Kansas state militia during the Civil War and fought in the Battle of Little Blue River (October 1864). He was captured and escaped three days later. He depicted the conflict in an oil painting, which is now in the collection of the Kansas Historical Society with four of his other paintings. His journal includes accounts of several Civil War battles, and his painting Before Dawn is used on the cover of the book Kansas's War: The Civil War in Documents (2011) by Pearl T. Ponce. He retired from service on October 30, 1864.

On December 18, 1867, he married Elizabeth Smith at La Harpe, Illinois. They had three children, the only one of whom survived was their daughter, Elizabeth. His wife died in 1898 in Topeka. He died at his home on September 15, 1914, and was buried in Rochester Cemetery.

See also
List of solved missing person cases: pre-2000

Notes

References

External links

 Official
Samuel James Reader Papers at the Kansas Historical Society
 General information

1836 births
1914 deaths
19th-century American male writers
20th-century American male writers
American abolitionists
American autobiographers
American Civil War prisoners of war
American diarists
American escapees
American male non-fiction writers
American militia officers
American people of English descent
American watercolorists
Artists from Topeka, Kansas
Bleeding Kansas
Burials in Kansas
Farmers from Kansas
Formerly missing people
Military personnel from Kansas
Missing person cases in Kansas (state)
Painters from Kansas
People from Washington County, Pennsylvania
People of Kansas in the American Civil War
Photographers from Kansas
Writers from Topeka, Kansas
Military personnel from Pennsylvania